Poshteh-ye Sofla (also Romanized as Poshteh-ye Soflá; also known as Poshteh Pā’īn and Poshteh-ye Pā’īn) is a village in Chalanchulan Rural District, Silakhor District, Dorud County, Lorestan Province, Iran. At the 2006 census, its population was 87, in 21 families.

References 

Towns and villages in Dorud County